The Official Vinyl Singles Chart is a weekly record chart compiled by the Official Charts Company (OCC) on behalf of the music industry in the United Kingdom. It lists the 40 most popular singles in the gramophone record (or "vinyl") format. This is a list of the singles which have been number one on the Official Vinyl Singles Chart in the 2020s.

Number ones

Notes

See also
List of Official Vinyl Singles Chart number ones of the 2010s

References

External links
Official Vinyl Singles Chart Top 40 at the Official Charts Company

Vinyl